Vernon Lajvin Edwards (born June 23, 1972) is a former American football defensive end who played for the San Diego Chargers of the National Football League (NFL). He played college football at Southern Methodist University.

References 

1972 births
Living people
Players of American football from Houston
American football defensive ends
SMU Mustangs football players
San Diego Chargers players